Murray Cooper Mitchell (March 19, 1923 – June 11, 2013) was an American professional basketball player. 

He played college basketball for Sam Houston State where he was a three time All-Lone Star Conference first team member. His college career was interrupted by World War II where he served in Europe. Following the war, he returned to Sam Houston. During the 1946-47 season, he set a conference scoring record with 285 points in 12 games.

After his collegiate career, Mitchell was selected in the 1948 BAA Draft by the Boston Celtics. In August 1949, he signed with the Anderson Packers where he appeared in two games, averaging 1.0 point and 1.0 assist per contest. He died in 2013.

Career statistics

NBA
Source

Regular season

References

1923 births
2013 deaths
American men's basketball players
Anderson Packers players
Basketball players from Texas
Boston Celtics draft picks
Centers (basketball)
High school basketball coaches in the United States
People from Huntsville, Texas
Sam Houston Bearkats football players
Sam Houston Bearkats men's basketball players
People from Corpus Christi, Texas
People from Live Oak County, Texas
People from Portland, Texas